The Kaskáda Golf Challenge is a golf tournament on the Challenge Tour, played at Kaskáda Golf Resort in Brno, Czech Republic. It was first played in July 2017 and was won by  Garrick Porteous. In 2019 the event was moved to May, two weeks before the D+D Real Czech Challenge, the other Challenge Tour tournament played in the Czech Republic.

Winners

References

External links

Coverage on the Challenge Tour's official site

Challenge Tour events
Golf tournaments in the Czech Republic
Sport in Prague
2017 establishments in the Czech Republic
Recurring sporting events established in 2017